Croatian Muslims are adherents of Islam in Croatia.

The term Croatian Muslims may also refer to:

 Muslim Croats, ethnic Croats who are adherents of Islam
 Ethnic Muslims in Croatia, distinctive minority of ethnic Muslims in  Croatia

See also 
 Bosnian Muslims (disambiguation)
 Serbian Muslims (disambiguation)